Mauro Vigliano (born 5 August 1975) is an Argentine professional football referee. He has been a full international for FIFA since 2013. He refereed some matches in Copa Libertadores and a game between Ecuador and Peru in the 2018 Russia World Cup Qualifiers.

Vigliano was the video assistant referee for the 2018 FIFA World Cup match between France and Australia on 16 June. Andrés Cunha, the head referee, used the VAR system to award a penalty kick, which was scored by Antoine Griezmann. The incident marked the first time a penalty had been awarded after consultation with a VAR in a World Cup match.

References 

1975 births
Living people
Argentine football referees
2018 FIFA World Cup referees
21st-century Argentine people